Mwanza is a town in Malawi on the border with Mozambique. It is the administrative headquarters for Mwanza District.

Location
Mwanza is the largest commercial, political and administrative urban centre of Mwanza District, in the Southern Region of Malawi. The geographical coordinates of Mwanza, Malawi are:15°35'55.0"S, 34°31'04.0"E (Latitude:-15.598611; Longitude:34.517778).

Population
The national census and household survey conducted in 2018, enumerated the population of Mwanza, Malawi at 18,039 inhabitants. The majority of people in the town and the district belong to the Chewa ethnic group.

Economy
The town is a market town for local produce, including honey, as well as a distribution market for commercial products and processed foods, such as maize flour. Mwanza also acts as a transshipment point for goods going down the Zambeze River via Tete. It is also a centre for smuggling. In 2007, Ethiopian illegal immigrants were discovered hidden in an oil tanker at Mwanza, Malawi, at the border with Mozambique, on their way to South Africa. In July 2012, 49 Ethiopian and Somali nationals drowned 
in Lake Malawi when the boat in which they were attempting to cross the lake capsized. The group which started in Tanzania, had intended to cross into Mozambique and finally to South Africa.

Infrastructure
It has both primary and secondary schools as well as a hospital. Mwanza District Hospital serves not only the local district, but also neighbouring Chikwawa District and Neno District in Malawi and the town of Zobue and Moatize District across the border in Mozambique.

The town has a railway station on the Nacala railway, under concession of Central East African Railways. The town of Mwanza has one of the most important railway stations on the Nacala railway, linking Moatize and Cana-Cana (west) to Nkaya and Port of Nacala (east).

References

External links
 Photo: Border Operations Assessment Mwanza-Zobue Border Posts As of 23 June 2011.
 Photo: Mwanza District Hospital As of 20 October 2009.

Populated places in Southern Region, Malawi
Malawi–Mozambique border crossings